Cephalopelvic disproportion (CPD) exists when the capacity of the pelvis is inadequate to allow the fetus to negotiate the birth canal. This may be due to a small pelvis, a nongynecoid pelvic formation, a large fetus, an unfavorable orientation of the fetus, or a combination of these factors. Certain medical conditions may distort pelvic bones, such as rickets or a pelvic fracture, and lead to CPD.

Transverse diagonal measurement has been proposed as a predictive method.

Signs and symptoms

Causes 
A large fetus can be one cause of CPD. A large fetus can be caused by gestational diabetes, postterm pregnancy, genetic factors, and multiparity.

The shape of the pelvis can also be a cause of CPD. The pelvis may be too small, or the shape of the pelvis may be malformed. Shorter women are more likely to have CPD as are adolescents.

Diagnosis 
Diagnosis of CPD may be made when there is failure to progress, but not all cases of prolonged labour are the result of CPD. Use of ultrasound to measure the size of the fetus in the womb is controversial, as these methods are often inaccurate and may lead to unnecessary caesarian section; a trial of labour is often recommended even if size of the fetus is estimated to be large.

Theoretically, pelvimetry may identify cephalo-pelvic disproportion. However, a woman's pelvis loosens up before birth (with the help of hormones). A Cochrane review in 2017 found that there was too little evidence to show whether pelvimetry is beneficial and safe when the baby is in cephalic presentation. A review in 2003 came to the conclusion that pelvimetry does not change the management of pregnant women, and recommended that all women should be allowed a trial of labor regardless of pelvimetry results. It considered routine performance of pelvimetry to be a waste of time, a potential liability, and an unnecessary discomfort.

Treatment 
In the case of a fetus being too large, some obstetricians recommend induction of labour for earlier delivery. Diagnosis of CPD in active labour will usually result in a Caesarian section.

See also
 Trial of labour

References

External links 

Complications of labour and delivery